In Australia, Diversional Therapy “is a client centred practice [that] recognises that leisure and recreational experiences are the right of all individuals.” Diversional Therapists promote the involvement in leisure, recreation and play by reducing barriers to their client's participation and providing opportunities where the individual may choose to participate and perform their occupation. Ideally these recreational activities promote self-esteem and personal fulfillment, through an emphasis on holistic care; providing physical, psychological, social, intellectual and spiritual/cultural/temporal support.

Diversional Therapists work in a wide variety of settings, such as 
Rehabilitation & hospital units,
Justice Centres, 
Community Centres, 
Day and Respite services, 
Aged Care Residential Facilities, 
Ethnic Specific Services, 
Palliative Care Units and Outreach Programmes, 
Mental Health Services, 
Specialist Organisations, 
Private Practice and 
Consultancy & Management.

The diversional therapist works with a client to achieve positive health outcomes by incorporating leisure programmes into their lifestyles. He or she assists decision-making and participation when developing and managing these programmes. These are often quite diverse and can range from: 
 Games, outings, gardening, computers, gentle exercise, music, arts and crafts.
 Individual emotional and social support
 Sensory enrichment, activities like massage and aromatherapy, pet therapy
 Environmental enrichment activities like role play , modeling 
 Discussion groups, education sessions like grooming, beauty care, cooking
 Social, cultural and spiritual activities

Diversional Therapy is not just about passing the time, about being entertainers or babysitters. As an unknown author once said "Recreation's purpose is not to kill time, but to make time live; not to keep people occupied, but to keep them refreshed; not to offer an escape from life, but to provide a discovery of life."

Becoming a Diversional Therapist 

To become a diversional therapist in Australia you must complete a diploma or degree in diversional therapy or leisure and health studies and this course needs to be recognised by the Diversional Therapy Association of Australia. Entry to the degree courses usually requires completion of your HSC/ACT Year 12 with prerequisite subjects, or assumed knowledge, in one or more of English, chemistry or biology. The various universities have different prerequisites and some have flexible entry requirements or offer external study. Contact the universities you are interested in for more information as requirements may change.

In New Zealand, you can complete a National Certificate in Diversion Therapy. This course of study generally takes 18 months to complete, and participants must have already achieved a Level 3 Core Competencies qualification, which is a basic all-round groundwork course. The diversional therapy courses are usually offered by institutions that focus on practical learning and skills, teaching about the roles of the diversional therapist and developing the ability to create a plan of care.

Benefits of Leisure
Leisure has many well documented health related benefits.

Physical Benefits can include:

 Decrease in blood pressure
 Decrease in heart rate
 Increase in bone mass and strength
 Increase in lung capacity 
 Reduction in incidence of diabetes
 Increase in muscle strength
 Increase in sense of well being
 Increase in flexibility, balance and coordination
 Improvement in immune system 

Emotional Benefits can include:

 Happiness
 Life satisfaction
 Morale
 Self-concept
 Self-esteem
 Perceived sense of freedom
 Independence
 Autonomy
 Self-confidence
 Leadership skills
 Tolerance/Understanding
 Problem solving skills

Further information
Diversional Therapy Association NSW Inc
Human Resource Management, ACT Health
NSW Health 
Diversional Therapy Resources
Diversional Therapy Monthly Magazine & Online Activities
Activities for Senior Adults & Caregivers

See also
Recreational therapy
Leisure

References

Therapy